Blok E (or Block E) is the propulsion unit of Soviet lunar module LK, developed in the 1960s by Yuzhnoye Design Bureau as a part of the manned lunar landing program.

Blok E was designed to soft land the LK on the surface of the Moon after orbital velocity was cancelled by Blok D. Later the same stage would fire for the second time for the liftoff and ascent from the Moon to rendezvous with the orbiting Soyuz 7K-LOK. Blok E used RD-858 (or 11D411), which has one nozzle and is deeply throttleable (from 2050 kg to 858 kg of thrust), as the primary engine. The backup engine was RD-859 (or 11D412), which has two nozzles.

Together, the two engines formed the propulsion system designated 11D410. Both engines burned a mix of unsymmetrical dimethyl hydrazine and nitrogen tetroxide. The hypergolic propellant components guaranteed their easy storage during a lunar expedition lasting at least 11 or 12 days.

The engines were equipped with clam-shell doors to prevent damaging it while staying on the surface of the Moon. There were four additional vernier engines placed between main and backup engine nozzles. Additionally to the main engine, the backup engine and the verniers, the stage was equipped with eight low-thrust reaction control thrusters feeding off a common propellant reserve. These thrusters had been provided by OKB-300, the Stepanov Aviation Bureau.

See also 
 N-1 – original launch vehicle for which this stage was developed

References

Notes 
a.Blok E was part of the N1-L3 lunar expeditionary complex, which was supposed to be launched on the rocket with the same name. As the N1 did not finish development, only dummy stages were launched on the third and fourth launch (serial 6L and 7L).

Soviet inventions
Rocket stages